Ralf de Souza Teles (born June 9, 1984), known simply as Ralf, is a Brazilian professional footballer who plays as a defensive midfielder for Vila Nova.

Club career
Ralf led Barueri to its first ever season in the Campeonato Paulista and Brazilian Série A. His consistent and quality play with Barueri led Corithians to make him one of several midfielders signed by the club in the 2010 pre-season. On July 13, 2012 he renewed his contract with Corinthians for another three years, despite transfer offers coming from European clubs.

Career statistics

FIFA Club World Cup

Honours

Club
Imperatriz
 Campeonato Maranhense: 2005

Corinthians
 Campeonato Brasileiro Série A: 2011, 2015
 Copa Libertadores da América: 2012
 FIFA Club World Cup: 2012
 Recopa Sudamericana: 2013
 Campeonato Paulista: 2013, 2018, 2019

International
Brazil
 Superclásico de las Américas (2): 2011, 2012

Individual
 Campeonato Brasileiro Série A Team of the Year: 2011

References

External links
 
 
 Profile at Globo Esporte's Futpédia
 Corinthians website Statistics
 Ralf's Noroeste statistics

1984 births
Living people
Brazilian footballers
Brazilian expatriate footballers
Association football midfielders
Footballers from São Paulo
Brazil international footballers
São Paulo FC players
Sociedade Imperatriz de Desportos players
Esporte Clube XV de Novembro (Jaú) players
Sociedade Esportiva do Gama players
Esporte Clube Noroeste players
Grêmio Barueri Futebol players
Sport Club Corinthians Paulista players
Beijing Guoan F.C. players
Avaí FC players
Cianorte Futebol Clube players
Vila Nova Futebol Clube players
Campeonato Brasileiro Série A players
Campeonato Brasileiro Série B players
Chinese Super League players
Brazilian expatriate sportspeople in China
Expatriate footballers in China